The Congregation of the Sisters of Charity of Nazareth (SCN) is a Roman Catholic order of nuns.  It was founded in 1812 near Bardstown, Kentucky, when three young women responded to Bishop John Baptist Mary David's call for assistance in ministering to the needs of the people of the area.

History
The Sisters of Charity of Nazareth were founded in 1812. Mother Catherine Spalding, along with Bishop John Baptist Mary David, are honored together and remembered as co-founders of the Sisters of Charity of Nazareth.

In 1812, in the newly formed diocese of Bardstown, Kentucky, Bishop Benedict Flaget was overwhelmed by the responsibility of providing religious education for the children of Catholic families who had migrated to Kentucky from Maryland after the Revolutionary War. In response to this need, Father John Baptist David, who had recently established St. Thomas Seminary, called for young women willing to devote their lives to the service of the Church. From among a group of six women that responded to the call, nineteen-year-old Catherine Spalding, originally from Maryland, was elected first superior of the Congregation. Mother Catherine guided the young Congregation for forty-five years.

The new community followed the rule of St. Vincent de Paul and their dwelling was named Nazareth. The symbol of the congregation is the pelican feeding its young from its own body. The Sisters' spiritual formation and service to their neighbors steadily expanded on the Kentucky frontier and beyond.

Ministry 
Their education ministry began in 1814 when the first school, Nazareth Academy, was opened at the motherhouse near Bardstown. Spalding founded Presentation Academy in Louisville, Kentucky, in 1831. The Academy began to grant degrees in 1829.

Since the beginning years of the congregation, SCNs have been involved in a variety of ministries, responding to the needs of the times. In 1832, when Catherine Spalding brought home two orphans left on the wharf in Louisville, their social work ministry began.  Pastoral ministry later emerged within the congregation as a distinct form of ministry after Vatican II as they followed the call of the Church to respond to the signs of the times.

In 1833, when cholera struck, SCNs nursed victims of the disease. So began their health care ministry, which continued as the sisters served in military hospitals during the Civil War.

In 1920, the Sisters opened Nazareth College in Louisville, Kentucky's first, four-year, Catholic college for women. The Louisville and Nazareth campuses merged. and in 1969, the school was renamed Spalding College. Two years later, all instructional activity was moved to the Louisville campus. Former dorms on SCN’s campus now function as affordable housing for the elderly and disabled. In 1984, Spalding College became Spalding University.

Modern times 
In 2000, the sisters apologized for the slaveholding past and erected a monument in memory of those who had suffered in their bondage.

Founded as a diocesan community, they are now an international congregation, both in ministry and membership. As of 2018, 550 sisters were serving in 20 states in the U.S., in India, Nepal, Botswana, and Belize.

They are committed to six priorities in ministry: promoting peace, promoting humanization of values, opposing racism, alleviating poverty, supporting women's issues and supporting environmental issues. Through their daily lives and ministries, in collaboration with their Associates and others, they are living out these priorities to meet the changing needs of today's world in their spirit of pioneering.

Mission

Their website reads: "The Sisters of Charity of Nazareth are an international Congregation in a multicultural world. Impelled by the love of Christ, in the tradition of Vincent de Paul and the pioneer spirit of Catherine Spalding, Sisters and Associates are committed to work for justice in solidarity with oppressed peoples, especially the economically poor and women, and to care for the earth. They risk their lives and resources, both personally and corporately, as they engage in diverse ministries in carrying out this mission."

See also
 St. Thomas-St. Vincent Orphanage

Notes

Sources
http://ncronline.org/news/women-religious/sisters-charity-nazareth-celebrate-two-centuries-service

External links 
Sisters of Charity of Nazareth

Catholic religious institutes established in the 19th century
Nazareth
History of women in Kentucky
Catholic female orders and societies
Religious organizations established in 1812
1812 establishments in Kentucky
Bardstown, Kentucky